Zdenka Grossmannová (born 17 November 1965 in Jindřichův Hradec) is a Czechoslovak-Czech slalom canoeist who competed from the early 1980s to the mid-1990s. She won two medals in the K1 team event at the ICF Canoe Slalom World Championships with a silver in 1991 and a bronze in 1989.

Grossmanová also finished seventh in the K1 event at the 1992 Summer Olympics in Barcelona.

World Cup individual podiums

References

Sports-reference.com profile

1965 births
Canoeists at the 1992 Summer Olympics
Czechoslovak female canoeists
Living people
Olympic canoeists of Czechoslovakia
Medalists at the ICF Canoe Slalom World Championships